Derby Bus Station serves the city of Derby, England.

The old bus station

The original bus station was the first purpose-built bus station in the United Kingdom. Designed by Charles Herbert Aslin, the Borough Architect, it opened in 1933. It was the first of its kind in the world, with railway-style platforms. It had an art deco cafe and diner, in which The Beatles allegedly once dined.

The station closed in October 2005 and was demolished in July 2006 following some degree of protest, most prominently from one individual who camped on the roof for several months in a final attempt to save the building. There were plans for a replica of some parts of the station to be built at Crich Tramway Museum, though this has not happened as of yet.

Current bus station
The present bus station was opened on 27 March 2010, with the first buses running from the station the following morning. It forms the major part of the Riverlights development, construction of which began in 2007, taking three years to complete.

Routes

Current 

 Ilkeston Flyer
 Skylink

Withdrawn 

 Spondon Flyer

References

External links

Information from Derby City Council website

Transport in Derby
Bus stations in the East Midlands
Buildings and structures in Derby
Transport infrastructure completed in 1933
Demolished buildings and structures in England
Transport infrastructure completed in 2010
1933 establishments in England
2010 establishments in England